Cavanillesia hylogeiton is a species of trees in the family Malvaceae. It is native to South America.

References

Bombacoideae
Trees of Bolivia
Trees of Brazil
Trees of Peru
Trees of Ecuador